We Were Liars is a 2014  psychological horror young-adult novel by E. Lockhart. The novel has received critical acclaim and won the Goodreads Choice Award for Best Young Adult Fiction. It was also listed as an ALA Top Ten Best Fiction for Young Adults for 2015.

We Were Liars focuses on the theme of consequences of one's mistakes. It is centered on the wealthy, seemingly perfect Sinclair family, who spend every summer sitting gathered on their private island. However, not every summer is the same—when something happens to Cadence during the summer of her fifteenth year, the four "Liars" (Cadence, Johnny, Gat and Mirren) re-emerge two years later to  prompt Cadence to remember the incident.

Plot 
Cadence Sinclair Eastman is the eldest grandchild of the wealthy Harris Sinclair. Although her family pretends to be perfect, Cadence knows that beneath the surface, wealth and privilege have taken an insidious toll on her family and that any unhappiness or odd behavior is ignored or repressed to perpetuate the image of refinement. Harris has three daughters, Cadence's mother Penny, and her aunts Carrie and Bess. Harris owns an island called Beechwood Island near Martha's Vineyard and has built a home for himself along with a house for each of his daughters.

The Sinclairs spend their summers on the island. Cadence and the other older cousins, Mirren, Johnny, along with Gat Patil (the nephew of Carrie's partner Ed) are known by the family as "The Liars". The summer Cadence is fifteen, which she refers to as Summer Fifteen, Gat and Cadence fall in love and begin a relationship.

During Summer Fifteen, Cadence suffers a serious head injury recalling only that she struck her head in the water. She loses most of her memories of that summer and begins to suffer from migraines. She also becomes addicted to Percocet and is forced to repeat a year at school. When she tries to reach out to her cousins she is ignored. Rather than allowing her to go to the island for the summer, Cadence's mother forces her to go on a tour of Europe with her father, with whom Cadence is no longer close to after he had an affair and abandoned the family.

During Summer Seventeen, Cadence is allowed to go back to the island and is surprised to find much has changed. Her controlling grandfather now suffers from dementia. His estate, Clairmont, has been replaced by New Clairmont, a cold architectural monstrosity that has none of the charms of the previous Clairmont. The Liars act strange around Cadence and refuse to talk about what happened in Summer Fifteen. They reject the idea of spending time at New Clairmont and instead camp out at Cuddledown, formerly the estate of Bess and her family.

Cadence begins to slowly remember events from the Summer Fifteen. She recalls that after her grandmother Tipper had died, her mother and aunts began to bicker over their inheritances. Though each woman had been given access to trust funds and education, none of them were able to earn a living independently and continued to depend on their controlling father to ensure their financial futures. Carrie had refused to marry Gat's uncle despite living together for nine years because Harris is opposed to her marrying a man of Indian descent. Cadence finally remembers that in Summer Fifteen, she proposed that she and the rest of the Liars should burn down Clairmont in order to get the family to stop feuding over the property. She is delighted with the idea that she was able to keep the family together until she recalls that the Liars forgot to release her grandfather's dogs, killing them. When she goes to Gat for comfort, he asks if she was able to recall anything else. In a plot twist, Cadence realizes that Johnny, Mirren, and Gat all died in the fire. She goes to visit the Liars at Cuddledown where they tell her that their deaths were not her fault and reveal that they will no longer be able to appear to her, all diving into the ocean and disappearing.

Characters

The Liars
 Cadence Sinclair Eastman – the oldest Sinclair grandchild and narrator of the book
 Gatwick Matthew Patil – the nephew of Aunt Carrie's partner, Ed, who starts coming to spend summers during Beechwood Year Eight
 Johnny Sinclair Dennis – Carrie's oldest child, born three weeks after Cadence, second oldest Sinclair grandchild
 Mirren Sinclair Sheffield – Bess's oldest daughter, third oldest Sinclair grandchild

The Sinclairs
 Harris Sinclair – The wealthy patriarch of the family who is controlling and enjoys watching his children fight to please him
 Tipper Sinclair – Matriarch of the family, married to Harris
 Penny Sinclair Eastman – Cadence's mother and the middle Sinclair daughter
 Carrie Sinclair Dennis – Mother to Jonathan and Will, oldest Sinclair daughter
 Bess Sinclair Sheffield – Mother to Mirren, Liberty, Bonnie, and Taft, the youngest Sinclair daughter
 Will Sinclair Dennis – Cadence's youngest cousin, son of Carrie
 Taft Sinclair Sheffield – Second youngest cousin, son of Bess
 Bonnie Sinclair Sheffield – Twin to Liberty, daughter of Bess
 Liberty Sinclair Sheffield – Twin to Bonnie, daughter of Bess

Pre-publication
E. Lockhart wrote We Were Liars with knowledge of the ending. She was particularly inspired by the twist endings in Gillian Flynn's Gone Girl, because the first twist still kept the reader interested, as well as Rebecca Stead's When You Reach Me which contained a lot of small details that fell into place at the end. The novel is written in five acts, though pieces of each were rearranged, particularly the middle three. Lockhart wrote the novel on the writing software Scrivener which made it easy to rearrange segments of text. She changed the structure of the ending shortly before the advance reader copy, based on suggestions from young adult author John Green.

As a child, Lockhart was "captivated" by fairy tale collections her mother had and incorporated a fairy tale feel to We Were Liars; she stated, "Fairy tales have been a preoccupation of mine for a very long time, and for a long time I wanted to write a contemporary story with a fairy-tale structure so I could unpack some of what I had spent so much time thinking about." The relationship between the Liars was inspired by Lockhart's "fantasy" of having close friends growing up, but also an attempt to "unpack" potential consequences of the bond. The character of Gat, who is part of the Liars but also an outsider to the family, was drawn from Lockhart's experience as a scholarship student at private schools, as well as Emily Brontë's novel Wuthering Heights. Lockhart also stated that some individuals close to her experience migraines and she was interested in exploring how pain affects one's personality and perception of the world.

The publisher hoped that the novel would have a large crossover appeal to adult readers because it had "teens who must interact with imperfect adults and imperfect adults who are important to the entire dynamic of the plot." To promote We Were Liars without giving too much of the plot away, a blog on Tumblr was created, focusing on the aesthetic of the Sinclair's island with quotes from the book. The promotional material urged readers to "just lie" if they were asked about the ending.

Themes
Los Angeles Times writer Amy Benfer described that thematically, We Were Liars was "a classic story of decaying aristocracy and the way that privilege can often hamstring more than help."

Release and reception
We Were Liars debuted at #6 on the New York Times Bestseller List in the young adult category. From June 1 to September 7, it spent 13 weeks on the top ten. Goodreads determined that it was the most-searched standalone title of 2014 on the website, leading them to declare it a possibility for the year's "it" book. Bustle affirmed this declaration, believing that the novel was "compulsively readable," had a "meaningful" plot, and was frequently talked about.

We Were Liars received mostly positive reviews from critics. Kirkus Reviews awarded We Were Liars a starred review, stating that it was "riveting, brutal and beautifully told." The review particularly praised Lockhart's humanizing of the Sinclairs. Publishers Weekly also wrote a starred review, referring to Lockhart's depiction of the family as "astute." School Library Journal reviewer Karyn Silverman said that Cadence's voice was the highlight of the novel, but also praised the "smart" writing in regards to plotting and complex characters. Katrina Hedeen of The Horn Book Magazine also gave a starred review, describing it as an "intriguing, atmospheric story" with a "taut psychological mystery" and unexpected twist. The Wall Street Journal also gave a positive review, noting the crossover appeal to adults and praising Cadence as an unreliable narrator.

Josh Lacey of The Guardian described the novel as "cunning" and "clever", calling the twist ending "nastier and more shocking than anything I had imagined." The Daily Telegraph'''s Martin Chilton gave the book four out of five stars, calling it "a mysterious and addictive treat" with a twist that is "dramatic and severe." Meg Rosoff, writing for The New York Times, felt that the execution "fell oddly flat"; she enjoyed the "snappy characterizations" of the privileged family, but felt that overall the novel was not able to fully delve into the personalities of the characters. In regards to the ending, however, she wrote that "Lockhart just about manages to pull it off, thanks to the freshness of the writing and the razor-sharp metaphor amnesia provides for the Sinclair family habit of denial."We Were Liars was listed among the best young adult books of 2014 by Kirkus Reviews, Publishers Weekly, School Library Journal, and The Wall Street Journal. It was also the only young adult novel listed in Amazon's Best 20 Books of the Year. 

TV adaptation
In July 2022, Lockhart announced that We Are Liars, as well as the prequel, Family of Liars'', would be adapted into a television show. The screen rights were acquired by Julie Plec’s My So-Called Company and Universal Television. Plec will adapt the books for television and called the opportunity a "career highlight".

References

External links 

2014 American novels
American young adult novels
Novels set on islands
Delacorte Press books